The First Hospital of Jiaxing (嘉兴市第一医院), or The First Hospital Affiliated to Jiaxing College, is a general hospital located in Jiaxing, Zhejiang Province, the People's Republic of China, with the rank of "Grade 3, Class B".

History
The predecessor of the First Hospital was Shengxin Hospital (圣心医院), a church hospital founded by French Catholic church in 1920. After the formation of PRC, Jiaxing municipal government took over the hospital in September 1951. In September 1952, it merged with Jiaxing Medical Institute, and became Jiaxing Municipal Hospital. It changed the name to the First Hospital of Jiaxing in November 1954. In September 1989, it became a teaching hospital of Zhejiang Medical University. In September 1992, Jiaxing Schistosomiasis Institute and the clinical part of Jiaxing Tuberculosis Institute were merged into the First Hospital. It became the First Hospital affiliated to Jiaxing College in 2001.

Present
The hospital has 610 standard beds. The actually opening beds are 820. There are totally 947 employees, among which 167 hold senior titles, and 329 hold junior titles.

Relocation
According to the city's planning, the First Hospital will relocate to South Zhonghuan Rd, southwest of Jiaxing Grand Bridge. The new campus has a land area of 138,750 m2, and a total building area of 179,907 m2. With the investment of 800 million RMB, the new hospital will have 1,500 beds and is expected to be completed by the end of 2009.

External links
The Official Website of the First Hospital of Jiaxing

Hospitals in Zhejiang
Hospital buildings completed in 2009
Jiaxing
Hospitals established in 1920
1920 establishments in China